John Spoltore (1971–2010) was an American professional ice hockey player.

Career 
From 1995–96 through 2000–01, Spoltore played with the Louisiana IceGators of the ECHL, scoring 532 points (142 goals and 390 assists) in 275 career ECHL games. In 2014, he was inducted into the ECHL Hall of Fame.

Awards and honors

References

External links

1971 births
2010 deaths
People from Bridgeton, New Jersey
Sportspeople from Cumberland County, New Jersey
Louisiana IceGators (ECHL) players
Kalamazoo Wings (1974–2000) players
North Bay Centennials players
Providence Bruins players
San Diego Gulls (WCHL) players
Springfield Falcons players
New Jersey Rockin' Rollers players
San Diego Barracudas players
Tampa Bay Tritons players
American men's ice hockey centers
Ice hockey players from New Jersey